El Diablo is a 1990 American Western comedy television film directed by Peter Markle. It stars Anthony Edwards and Louis Gossett Jr. The film was co-written by Tommy Lee Wallace, John Carpenter and Bill Phillips, and produced by Carpenter and Debra Hill.

El Diablo focuses on Billy Ray Smith (Edwards), a teacher living in Texas, as he tracks down the outlaw El Diablo (Robert Beltran), who has kidnapped one of Smith's students. Along the way, Smith meets up with professional gunfighter Thomas Van Leek (Gossett), who helps him recruit a team to take down the outlaw and save the girl.

Plot
Billy Ray Smith is a timid young schoolteacher from Boston living in a rugged Texas town. One of his students, a teenage girl named Nettie Tuleen, has an unrequited crush on him. While Billy Ray reads a story to the class by his favorite author, Kid Durango, the town is invaded by a gang of outlaws led by El Diablo, who kidnaps Nettie. Billy Ray tries to intervene, but only comes away with one of the outlaw's heirloom spurs as Diablo rides away. The sheriff leads a party in pursuit, only to return with a group of riderless horses and with his tongue cut out.

Billy Ray vows to rescue Nettie with the help of Kid Durango (reputed to be "the fastest gun in the West") despite not knowing how to ride a horse or shoot a gun. His ineptitude is displayed when on his way out of town, his mount rears up and throws him from the saddle, the impact causing his revolver to discharge and kill his horse. He arrives by train in the town of Millennium in search of J.D. Shones, a sheriff who had apparently rode with Kid Durango. Billy Ray discovers that Shones is already dead, having been killed by the current sheriff, who is in turn shot in the back by an aging gunslinger named Thomas Van Leek, a friend of Kid Durango who offers his services to Billy Ray and procures him a new horse. However, when Billy Ray explains that he is pursuing El Diablo, Van Leek calls him a fool and abandons him. He later returns to save Billy Ray from a group of bounty hunters who mistakenly believe he killed the sheriff.

The next day, Van Leek begins to assemble a group of skilled professionals to aid them on their journey, using Diablo's spur as a calling card. The first to join them is a blacksmith named Bebe Patterson, one of Van Leek's old friends. Next, the group interrupts a hanging orchestrated by the preacher/con artist Autolycus who is about to execute two men: an explosives expert named Roberto "Bob" Zamudio and a criminal known as Pitchfork Napier. All three join the group en route to Mexico, but Napier is soon killed and replaced by the Native American, Dancing Bear, as revenge for Napier having slept with his wife. After retrieving a cache of dynamite Zamudio had buried in the desert, the party stops at a saloon where Billy Ray is finally introduced to Kid Durango. However, he is shocked to learn that Durango (a mild-mannered fellow whose real name is Truman Feathers) is not the hero he was expecting, and that all of his stories were in fact based upon Van Leek's exploits.

Upon spotting Pestoso, one of El Diablo's henchmen in the saloon, Van Leek convinces Billy Ray to confront him in a showdown. Although terrified, Billy Ray stands his ground until the two draw their guns, with Van Leek secretly sniping the henchman from a nearby bell tower. Afterwards, Pestoso's companion Chak Mol instructs Billy Ray to meet him alone the next morning at the "tree of death", while Kid Durango, inspired by Billy Ray and looking for new material to write about, joins the group on their quest.

Chak Mol escorts Billy Ray into El Diablo's hideout, where he is bound to a tree before coming face-to-face with the dangerous outlaw. Though he offers to trade Diablo's spur for Nettie's release, Diablo declines before introducing Nettie as "Rosita", his new consort. Meanwhile, Bebe, Zamudio, and Autolycus are confronted by a group of Diablo's men; Autolycus and Zamudio are killed, leaving Bebe to carry out their plan alone. He speeds toward the compound in his wagon loaded with Zamudio's dynamite, but his leg gets trapped before he can jump free. Laughing maniacally, Bebe crashes into the hideout, the explosion serving as a distraction for Dancing Bear and Van Leek to open fire on Diablo's henchmen. El Diablo escapes the shootout, taking Nettie with him. In the aftermath, Van Leek finds a hidden chest of gold, alluding to an earlier suspicion by Kid Durango that Van Leek was more interested in Diablo's riches than Nettie's rescue. Disgusted, Billy Ray leaves to find Nettie on his own.

After chasing the young woman into a cave, he is confronted by El Diablo. Their meeting is interrupted by Kid Durango who, inspired to prove himself as a hero, challenges Diablo to a duel and is gunned down. With his last breaths, he implores Billy Ray to kill Diablo and "complete the story". Diablo taunts Billy Ray before deciding to shoot him in the head, but Van Leek calls him out before he can pull the trigger. Diablo wounds Van Leek in the shoulder, disarming him, but Billy Ray intervenes by shooting the outlaw in the back twice, much to Van Leek's amusement.

Afterwards, the deceased group members are buried and Billy Ray pays his final respects to Kid Durango before returning Nettie home to her mother. As Billy Ray and Van Leek head out of town, a forlorn Nettie asks if he will be coming back, to which Billy Ray answers, "Someday." The townspeople respectfully acknowledge Billy Ray, as he and Van Leek discuss plans for a new book series based on their adventures together.

Cast
 Anthony Edwards as Billy Ray Smith 
 Louis Gossett Jr. as Thomas Van Leek
 Joe Pantoliano as Kid Durango
 John Glover as The Preacher 
 Robert Beltran as 'El Diablo'
 M. C. Gainey as Bebe
 Miguel Sandoval as Zamudio
 Sarah Trigger as Nettie Tuleen
 Branscombe Richmond as Dancing Bear
 Jim Beaver as Spivey Irick
 Don Collier as Jake
 Ann Risley as Judith

Production
According to a 1979 issue of Cinefantastique magazine, it was originally intended for co-writer John Carpenter to direct El Diablo himself in 1980 as his next film after completing The Fog. However, he declined to do so, later saying he was nervous about directing a Western. The project then lay dormant for an entire decade before being directed by Peter Markle. Carpenter, and his associate Debra Hill (who co-wrote and produced The Fog), acted as executive producers.

Reception
The film received positive reviews from Empire and Entertainment Weekly.

References

External links 

1990 films
1990 comedy films
1990 Western (genre) films
1990s English-language films
1990s Western (genre) comedy films
American comedy television films
American Western (genre) comedy films
Films directed by Peter Markle
Films scored by William Olvis
Films set in Texas
Films with screenplays by John Carpenter
HBO Films films
Western (genre) television films
1990s American films